Sharon Louise Page (born 27 June 1971) is an female English former swimmer.

Swimming career
Page represented Great Britain in the women's 100 metres backstroke at the 1988 Seoul Olympics. At the ASA National British Championships she won the 100 metres backstroke title in 1990.

International competitions

References

External links
 

1971 births
Living people
British female swimmers
Olympic swimmers of Great Britain
Swimmers at the 1988 Summer Olympics
People from Gorleston-on-Sea